The York–Bruce Rock railway line is a closed railway line in the Wheatbelt region of Western Australia running from York to Bruce Rock.

History

On 29 June 1885, the Eastern Railway opened from Chidlow's Well to York. Another line opened south to Beverley on 5 August 1886 and ultimately Albany via the Great Southern Railway.

On 9 September 1897, construction commenced on a line to Greenhills, with the line opening on 1 September 1898. On 24 April 1908, it was extended to Quairading, and to Bruce Rock on 4 July 1913.

The line was initially served by a thrice weekly mixed train; this was later reduced to twice weekly. Once the line from Bruce Rock to Merredin was opened in December 1913, a through service was introduced. In 1938, a thrice weekly through service from Perth to Merredin was introduced with ADE railcars. This reduced the travel time from 17 hours to eight.

In August 1949, a road bus service was introduced. By January 1951, the railcar service had been reduced to once weekly and was withdrawn entirely in March 1952. Diesel locomotives were introduced to the line in 1955, working in parallel with steam locomotives until 1970.

In 1985, the line was closed between Yoting and Shackleton, the line now operating as two separate lines from York to Yoting and Bruce Rock to Shackleton. In October 1990, the haulage of superphosphate ceased, with the line exclusively used by grain trains. It was cut back to Quairading in the 1990s and closed entirely in October 2013.

References

External links

Closed railway lines in Western Australia
Railway lines opened in 1894
Wheatbelt railway lines of Western Australia
Railway lines closed in 2013